Blame It on Me is the debut album by singer-songwriter Alana Davis. It was released in 1997 and contained her two most popular singles, "32 Flavors" and "Crazy". The album peaked at No. 157 on the U.S. Billboard 200.

Track listing

References

1997 debut albums
Alana Davis albums
Elektra Records albums